Mr Timothy (a.k.a. 'T-Funk', real name Tim Dudfield) is an Australian dance music producer and DJ. Over the years, he has worked on projects by a wide variety of artists including Madonna, INXS, Felix da Housecat, E Smoove, Inaya Day, Slinkee Minx, Brandy, Cher, Craig David, and Steve Silk Hurley.

Career
In 2002, he released his debut single "Keep Rockin", which failed to chart. In 2004, he recorded "I Am tha 1" with American singer Inaya Day. The song reached peaked at number 28 on the ARIA charts on 12 July 2004. At the ARIA Music Awards of 2004, the song was nominated for Best Dance Release.

On 18 October 2004, MrTimothy released "Stand By Me" also featuring Inaya Day. The song peaked at number 59 on the ARIA charts. charted. In November 2004, MrTimothy released his debut studio album This Is Tha 1. Two further singles were released from the album; "4 Ever" and "I'm On My Way".

In 2005, MrTimothy changed his name to T-Funk and released a cover of "The Glamorous Life", again with Inaya Day. The song peaked at number 31 on the ARIA charts. In 2006, he released "Be Together" with Katie Underwood which also peaked at number 31 on the ARIA charts. In 2007, T-Funk returned to MrTimothy and released "I Don't Think That You Know" with Nat Dunn.

In April 2008, mrTimothy released a remix album of Katie Noonan's studio album Skin, titled Second Skin. The album debuted and peaked at number 19 on ARIA Dance Chart on 28 April 2008.

Discography

Albums

Singles

Awards

ARIA Music Awards
The ARIA Music Awards is an annual awards ceremony that recognises excellence, innovation, and achievement across all genres of Australian music. They commenced in 1987. CMr Timothy was nominated for one award.

|-
| 2004
| "I Am Tha 1"
| ARIA Award for Best Dance Release
| 
|-

References

Australian record producers
Australian dance musicians
Living people
Electronic dance music DJs
Year of birth missing (living people)